Pterolophia atrofasciata is a species of beetle in the family Cerambycidae. It was described by Maurice Pic in 1925.

References

atrofasciata
Beetles described in 1925